The , often abbreviated as Shingosenshū, is an imperial anthology of Japanese waka poetry. The title is in opposition to the previous Gosen Wakashū. It was completed in 1303, two years after the Retired Emperor Go-Uda first ordered. It was compiled by Fujiwara no Tameyo and consists of twenty volumes containing 1,606 poems.

References

pg. 485 of Japanese Court Poetry, Earl Miner, Robert H. Brower. 1961, Stanford University Press, LCCN 61-10925

Japanese poetry anthologies
Early Middle Japanese texts
1300s in Japan
1303 books